The Men's downhill competition of the Calgary 1988 Olympics was held at the newly-developed Nakiska on Mount Allan on Monday, February 15.

The reigning world champion was Peter Müller, while all-around Pirmin Zurbriggen was the defending World Cup downhill champion, led the current season, and was a medal threat in all five alpine events.  Defending Olympic champion Bill Johnson did not make the U.S. Olympic team; this was the third of four consecutive Olympics without the defending champion in the field.

More than a second behind the runner-up was bronze medalist Franck Piccard. Leonhard Stock, the 1980 champion, was fourth, but nearly two seconds behind Zurbriggen. 

Results
The race was started at 11:30 local time, (UTC  −7).

References

External links
FIS results

Men's downhill
Winter Olympics